The Porsche Museum is an automobile museum in the Zuffenhausen district of Stuttgart, Germany on the site of carmaker Porsche.

History 
The original Porsche museum opened in 1976 in a side-road near the Porsche factory. It was a relatively small works museum with little parking space and it was only big enough to hold around 20 exhibits (in rotation).

Porsche built the museum as a kind of "rolling museum" with rotating exhibits from a stock of 300 restored cars, many in pristine condition and still in full driving order. Originally there was discussion that the new museum would be built alongside a new Mercedes-Benz museum on former trade fair grounds in the Killesberg area of Stuttgart. After the new Mercedes-Benz Museum opened in the east of Stuttgart in 2006, Porsche went ahead with plans to upgrade and extend its museum in the northern district of Zuffenhausen next to the company headquarters. Originally costs were set at 60 million euros but days before the official opening ceremony on 29 January 2009, it was confirmed that the actual costs hit 100 million euros.

Work on the concept for the new Porsche Museum began in 2003. A storyboard comprising relevant topics, exhibits and their presentation was drawn up and a permanent exhibition was designed.

The new museum

Overview
The new Porsche museum stands on a conspicuous junction just outside Porsche Headquarters in Zuffenhausen. The display area covers 5600 square metres featuring over 80 exhibits, many rare cars and a variety of historical models.

The museum was designed by the architects Delugan Meissl Associated Architects. The exhibition spaces were designed by HG Merz, who was also involved in the building of the award-winning Mercedes-Benz Museum.

On October 17, 2005, the construction of the museum officially kicked off. On 8 December 2008 the museum was handed over to the client, and it officially opened one month later, on 28 January. Since 31 January 2009 it has opened its doors to visitors.

The result is an exhibition that focuses firmly on the vehicles showcased. All ancillary architectural, media and typographic elements are designed to be unobtrusive and complement the cars.

The museum, which is as flexible as it is exclusive, functions as a home base for the vehicles.

Construction

Selected exhibits

See also
List of automobile museums
Mercedes-Benz Museum

References

Notes

Bibliography

Official Porsche company information on the new museum

External links 

Porsche Museum – official site
Porsche Automuseum Gmünd
Cisitalia Museum
Porsche Museum on Design Build Network
Google Virtual Gallery Tour
The New York Times: Touring the Temples of German Automaking – includes a description of a visit to the museum
Porsche Newsroom - official press releases

Porsche
Museums in Stuttgart
Automobile museums in Germany
Museums established in 1976
1976 establishments in West Germany